Silvana Bosi (23 July 1934 – 10 August 2020) was an Italian actress.

Partial filmography

Soldati - 365 all'alba (1987)
The Strangeness of Life (1987)
Mortacci (1989)
The Voice of the Moon (1990)
Rossini! Rossini! (1991)
The End Is Known (1992)
Absolute Giganten (1999)
The Talented Mr. Ripley (1999)
Bread and Tulips (2000)
A Journey Called Love (2002)
Agata and the Storm (2004)
Letters to Juliet (2010)
The American (2010)

References

External links
 

1934 births
2020 deaths
Italian film actresses
Italian stage actresses
Italian radio personalities
Italian television actresses
20th-century Italian actresses
21st-century Italian actresses